The Informed Consent Action Network (ICAN) is one of the main anti-vaccination groups in the United States. Founded in 2016 by Del Bigtree, it spreads misinformation about the risks of vaccines and contributes to vaccine hesitancy, which has been identified by the World Health Organization as one of the top ten global health threats of 2019. Arguments against vaccination are contradicted by overwhelming scientific consensus about the safety and effectiveness of vaccines.

Funding and activities

ICAN was founded in 2016 by television producer Del Bigtree, after the release of the movie Vaxxed: From Cover-Up to Catastrophe, which he wrote and produced, with anti-vaccination activist Andrew Wakefield directing. The national attention Bigtree gained with the movie and its promotion tour allowed the newly-formed group to quickly assume a leading role among the anti-vaccination movement. Scientists have countered many of ICAN's statements, arguments against vaccination being contradicted by overwhelming scientific consensus about the safety and efficacy of vaccines.

ICAN was established with a $100,000 grant from the Selz Foundation. Its budget ballooned to $1.4 million in 2017, with one million coming from the Selz Foundation, making ICAN the most well-funded anti-vaccination group in the United States that year. In 2019, the Selz had stopped their funding, but ICAN received $2.46 million funneled through the donor-directed charitable trust investment firm T. Rowe Price, out of total revenue of $3.46 million. ICAN reported making $5.5 million in revenue in 2020, a 60% increase from the previous year.

In 2019, ICAN paid a salary of $232,000 to Del Bigtree as its CEO, $162,000 to its Executive Producer Jenn Sherry Parry, $138,000 to its Chief Administrative Officer Catharine Layton, and 111,000 to Patrick Layton as Creative Director. An article in Rolling Stone states that Layton stumbled upon the anti-vaccine movement on social media after her two sons were diagnosed with autism.

Despite spreading misinformation about vaccines, the group received a federal loan of $165,600 through the Paycheck Protection Program in 2020. It also holds Facebook fundraisers, this contributing $23,000 to its bottom line in 2021. Like other anti-vaccination groups, ICAN directs their Instagram followers to a fundraising tool.

In 2019, Bigtree was a keynote speaker at several anti-vaccination events targeting the ultra-Orthodox Jewish in Brooklyn and in Rockland County. He has been criticized by the Anti-Defamation League and the Auschwitz-Birkenau Memorial and Museum for wearing a Star of David at an anti-vaccination event, attempting to compare the treatment of those opposed to vaccination with the persecution of the Jewish people. Bigtree's anti-vaccine advocacy has been described by anti-vaccination movement critic physician David Gorski as "fear mongering based on misinformation".

In 2020, Facebook and Youtube removed Del Bigtree's anti-vaccination show The Highwire from their social media platforms, as part of efforts to limit the spread of disinformation about COVID-19. ICAN sued them for that, alleging the audience of the videos have decreased by half since they had to relocate it on their own website, although it continued streaming on Twitter. ICAN lost the court case in early 2022.

Experts observing the anti-vaccination movement believe ICAN is crafting its communications in order to appeal to the segment of the population that distrusts expertise and government. Bigtree regularly appears in events that cater to those ideologies, including an event in October, 2020, at Trump National Doral Miami, a Florida resort owned by Donald Trump, where several leading figures of the QAnon movement also spoke.

Access to information lawsuit
ICAN spends a large part of its budget on legal fees, paid to Siri & Glimstad. The law firm has made a specialty out of challenging vaccine mandate during the COVID-19 pandemic.

In 2018, ICAN filed Freedom of information lawsuits to force the Food and Drug Administration, the National Institutes of Health and the Department of Health and Human Services (HHS) to release administrative reports on childhood vaccine injury HHS is required to file with Congress. HHS replied that they could not find any such reports. While ICAN claimed the absence of these reports means that the federal government has neglected to properly study the effect of vaccines,
scientists and the fact-checking site Politifact pointed out a large number of in-depth studies were undertaken and their results shared with the public, even though HHS failed to file the required reports.

References

See also
Herd immunity
Science Moms

2016 establishments in the United States
Anti-vaccination organizations
Autism pseudoscience
Anti-vaccination in the United States